Omar Slimi (born October 21, 1987 in Béchar) is an Algerian football player.

Club career
Slimi began his career with USM Bel Abbès. In 2007, he joined ASO Chlef, where he would spend the next three and a half seasons.

CR Belouizdad
On January 27, 2011, Slimi signed an 18-month contract with CR Belouizdad. On April 25, 2011, he made his debut for the club as a starter in a league match against AS Khroub.

MC Oran
On August 14, 2011, Slimi signed a two-year contract with MC Oran, joining them on free transfer from CR Belouizdad.

References

External links
 DZFoot Profile
 

1987 births
Algerian footballers
Algerian Ligue Professionnelle 1 players
People from Béchar
ASO Chlef players
CR Belouizdad players
MC Oran players
USM Bel Abbès players
Living people
Association football defenders
21st-century Algerian people